Andrei Lvovich Murygin (born 5 February 1962) is a former Russian football player.

References

1962 births
Living people
Soviet footballers
FC Zhemchuzhina Sochi players
Russian footballers
Russian Premier League players
FC Sibir Novosibirsk players
Association football defenders
FC Dynamo Vologda players
FC Bulat Cherepovets players